Janne Corax (born 1967) is a Swedish cyclist,  mountaineer and explorer. He has travelled in 110 countries and cycled more than 82,500 km. He lives in Målilla in southern Sweden. He is an authority on Tibet, across which he has made several long and unsupported expeditions.

Crossing of Northern Tibet 
In 2003 he and Nadine Saulnier made the first ever cycle crossing of the uninhabited and trackless 5,000 metre high Chang Tang plateau of Northern Tibet. The crossing resulted in a 30-minute film, called "Too Tired", part of the series "Into The Unknown" on National Geographic's international channel. The crossing was also reported in Japanese Alpine News.

First ascents in Tibet 
Corax has achieved first ascents of several very remote 6,000 metre Tibetan mountains.

On 26 June 2007, he and Nadine Saulnier summitted 6323 m  Kangzhagri after cycling across the wilderness for 28 days.

On 2 September 2007, with Jeff Garnand, he made the first ascent of 6,214 m Sirenshou in Dahongliutan Kunlun. On 12 September they ascended 6,370 m Jiao Feng.
On 6 October 2007 he summitted the north east and highest (6369 m) peak of Toze Kangri followed shortly by Waltraud Schultze, Kjetil Kjernsmo and Andy Hessberg. Two days earlier, with Waltraud Schultze, he had summitted the south west top (6366 m). On October 8 he summitted the 6028 m Toze Pyramid, to achieve 3 first ascents in four days.
On 12 March 2008, he made a winter solo ascent, and possibly the first ascent, of 6028 m  Jietanzhouma, in the Lhakoi/Hlako Kangri group/Himal - Noijin Kangsang sub group of Central Tibet. On 6 April, he made a late winter, solo and first ascent of 6424 m Pulha Ri, in the same group.
In the summer of 2008, Corax, Saulnier and Martin Adserballe made a repeat unsupported crossing of the Chang Tang. They passed Ulugh Muztagh on the southern side as first unsupported travellers ever. On 28 June, day 37 of the trip, they made the first ascent of 6388 m Kukushili (Songzhiling), in the  central north Chang Tang. On 9 July, day 48, they made the first ascent of 6438 m Purog Kangri, which is part of the Zangser Kangri Massif, in the Burog Co area.

Other climbs

2002
 Participated in a world record attempt to summit Muztagh Ata by bike.
 First ascent of Bonete Grande in Argentina.

2005
Caucasus Mountains - Elbrus, Gumachi, Aristova
Pakistan - Gasherbrum II (did not summit)
Africa - Mount Kilimanjaro and Lenana (side peak of Mount Kenya)
Argentina - bicycling and climbing tour in the Andes - San Bernardo, Vallecitos, Platita/Pico Plata, Plata, Bonete, Manso, Aconcagua, (twice) Bonete Chico, Pissis II/Pissis East, Bonete Grande, Pissis, Incahuasi, Ojos del Salado. His GPS measurements were among those that established that Ojos del Salado is higher than Monte Pissis.

2006
Argentina: - San Bernardo 4142 m, Adolfo Calle 4200 m, Stepanek 4080 m, Plata 5827 m, Vallecitos 5509 m, Rincon 5318 m, Franke 4880 m, Lomas Amarillos 5100 m, Manso 5434 m, Aconcagua 6962 m, El Muerto 6488 m, Olmedo 6250 m, Cazadero 6658 m, Mercedario 6700 m, Trabante II 5250 m, Ramada 6384 m.
Asia: - Pik Lenin 7,134 m high, in Kyrgyzstan after a 4-day long attack in alpine style. A week before Muztagh Ata, 7.546 m high, in China.

References

External links
Janne Corax's webpage
Janne Corax's summitpost profile

See also 
Bicycle touring
List of climbers

1967 births
Living people
Swedish male cyclists
Ultra-distance cyclists
Swedish mountain climbers
Male touring cyclists
Place of birth missing (living people)